Basa or Baša is a surname. Notable people with the surname include:

César Basa (1915-1941), Philippine Air Force pilot and first Filipino casualty of World War II
Marko Baša (born 1982), Montenegrin footballer
Román Basa (1848-1897), Filipino leader of a secret society opposed to Spanish rule
Victor Basa (born 1985), Filipino model, actor and VJ